Jeff (Daniel) Silva is a Boston filmmaker and film programmer.  Ivan & Ivana (2011) and Balkan Rhapsodies: 78 Measures of War (2008), have been exhibited at film festivals and museums internationally, including MoMA's Documentary Fortnight, The Viennale, Visions du Reel, Valdivia, Flahertiana, and DocAviv.. In 2016, he worked on Linefork, a feature about Lee Sexton.  Silva programmed cinema for 15 years at the Balagan film series, which he co-founded in 2000.  He was a teaching fellow at Harvard University. Silva taught at the School of the Museum of Fine Arts (SMFA) in Boston.

Filmography 
 Without A Map (1996)
 Irish Whiskey (1997)
 Movement (R)evolution Africa (2007)
 Balkan Rhapsodies: 78 Measures of War (2008)
 Ivan & Ivana (2011)
 ''Linefork (Vic Rawlings, Jeff Daniel Silva)  (2016)

References

External links 
 

American documentary film directors
Year of birth missing (living people)
Living people